Beautiful is Taiwanese Mandopop singer-songwriter David Tao's fifth Mandarin studio album. It was released on 4 August 2006 by EMI Music Taiwan.

The album features a mid-tempo duet, "今天妳要嫁給我" (Marry Me Today), with Jolin Tsai. It was awarded Best Song of the Year at the 18th Golden Melody Awards in 2007, and Best Loved by Audience and one of the Top 10 Songs of the Year at the 2007 HITO Radio Music Awards, presented by Taiwanese radio station Hit FM. The track, "似曾相識" (Finally) won Best Composer award for Tao also at the 2007 HITO Radio Music Awards.

The tracks "忘不了" (Can't Get You Outta My Mind) and "太美麗" (Too Beautiful) were nominated for Top 10 Gold Songs at the Hong Kong TVB8 Awards, presented by television station TVB8, in 2006.

The album was awarded one of the Top 10 Selling Mandarin Albums of the Year at the 2006 IFPI Hong Kong Album Sales Awards, presented by the Hong Kong branch of IFPI.

Track listing
 "太美麗廣播電台" (Too Beautiful Radio Station)
 "忘不了" (Can't Get You Outta My Mind)
 "太美麗" (Too Beautiful)
 "追" (The Chase)
 "那一瞬間" (The Moment)
 "Walk On"
 "自導自演的悲劇" (How Long)
 "祝妳幸福" (I Don't Wanna Know) 
 "似曾相識" (Finally)
 "今天妳要嫁給我" (Marry Me Today) – feat. Jolin Tsai
 "每一面都美" (So Beautiful)
 "不愛" (Forever) 
 "Olia"

References

External links
  David Tao@Gold Typhoon formerly EMI Music Taiwan

2006 albums
David Tao albums
Gold Typhoon Taiwan albums